Colm Keaveney (born 11 January 1971) is an Irish Fianna Fáil politician. He was elected as a Labour Party Teachta Dála (TD) for the Galway East constituency at the 2011 general election, He sat as an Independent TD after losing the Labour whip in December 2012. He resigned from the party in June 2013, and joined Fianna Fáil in December 2013. He is a former Chairman of the Labour Party. He lost his seat at the 2016 general election and was elected to Galway County Council in 2019.

Origins
He is originally from the village of Garrafrauns, in north County Galway. He was educated at St.Patrick's P.S. and St Jarlath's College in Tuam.

Political career
Keaveney was an unsuccessful candidate in Galway East at the 1997 general election. He was first elected to Tuam Town Council in the 1999 local elections. In 2004 he was elected to Galway County Council, gaining just under 2,000 votes in the Tuam electoral area.

He is a former SIPTU trade union official and former President of the Union of Students in Ireland (USI).

At the 2011 general election, he was elected as the first ever Labour Party TD for the Galway East constituency, taking the last seat on the ninth count with a total poll of 10,126 votes.

At the 2012 Labour Party Conference in Galway, he was elected Chairman of the Labour Party. Following the publication of the 2012 Constituency Commission report, he was listed by The Irish Times as one of 13 TDs most likely to lose their seats in the next election. New boundaries saw Galway East lose a seat and the transfer of 20,500 voters out of the constituency, centred on his home town of Tuam.

On 13 December 2012, he voted against the government on the cut to the respite care grant, which formed part of the 2013 budget; this led to his loss of the Parliamentary Labour Party whip. In a tweet just before the vote in the Dáil, he said "Acta non-verba", Latin for "deeds not words". He remained as Chairman of the Labour Party, as he was elected by the party members. Keaveney subsequently resigned from the party on 26 June 2013. Keaveney vocally opposed the government's X-Case legislation, both because of the absence of a time limit for termination and because he feared that the "suicide" clause would "normalise" suicide at a time when it was already becoming a serious problem in Ireland. He had previously expressed pro-choice views, telling a Tuam Town Council debate in 2000 that abortion was "the last resort for women and every aspect of a woman’s decision should be looked at and taken into consideration" and that anti-abortion literature distributed by colleague Martin Ward was "sickening and offensive".

In December 2013, he joined the Fianna Fáil party. Keaveney said that Fianna Fáil ".. has learned from its mistakes in the past" and he would be a Fianna Fáil candidate at the next general election for Galway East. In response to his application, Labour TD Pat Rabbitte, who had clashed with Keaveney repeatedly, derisively referred to it as "a match made in heaven".

Keaveney's defection was met with opposition from local members of Fianna Fáil in Galway East, particularly from supporters of local TD Michael Kitt and former MEP Mark Killilea. Fianna Fáil leader Michéal Martin was forced to deny rumours that Keaveney would be selected as the sole candidate for the party in the next general election.

He was an unsuccessful Fianna Fáil candidate for the Galway East constituency at the 2016 general election and was elected to Galway County Council in the Tuam Local Electoral Area in the 2019 Local Elections.

References

1971 births
Living people
Alumni of University College Dublin
Fianna Fáil TDs
Independent TDs
Irish trade unionists
Labour Party (Ireland) TDs
Local councillors in County Galway
Members of the 31st Dáil
People educated at St Jarlath's College
Politicians from County Galway